Tina Lifford is an American actress and playwright. She is best known for her leading role as single mother Joan Mosley in the critically acclaimed but short-lived Fox comedy-drama series, South Central (1994), and her recurring role as Renee Trussell in the NBC drama series, Parenthood (2010–2015). She has starring roles in the feature films Grand Canyon (1991), Blood Work (2002), and Hostage (2005). In 2016, Lifford began starring as Violet Bordelon (Aunt Vi) in the Oprah Winfrey Network drama series, Queen Sugar.

Life and career
Tina Lifford began her career in 1980s, appearing on television shows include Hill Street Blues, Cagney & Lacey, and Murder, She Wrote. From 1983 to 1988, she had the recurring role on Knots Landing. In film, she made her debut in The Ladies Club (1986). The following years, she had appeared in films include Nuts (1987), Colors (1988), Paris Trout (1991), Grand Canyon (1991), Letters from a Killer (1998), Panic (2000), Pay It Forward (2000), Joe Somebody (2001), Blood Work (2002), Hostage (2005), and Catch and Release (2006).

Lifford played the leading role as single mother Joan Mosley in the critically acclaimed but short-lived Fox comedy-drama series, South Central (1994). In addition to her leading role on South Central, Lifford was regular cast member on the short-lived NBC drama, Crisis Center (1997). She had number of starring roles on the made-for-television movies, include The Ernest Green Story (1993), Run for the Dream: The Gail Devers Story (1996) playing Jackie Joyner-Kersee, Mandela and de Klerk (1997) as Winnie Mandela, The Temptations (1998), and The Loretta Claiborne Story (2000) starring Kimberly Elise.

Over her career, Lifford has guest-starred in over 50 shows, include Touched by an Angel, Star Trek: Deep Space Nine, Any Day Now, NYPD Blue, NCIS, ER, and Nip/Tuck. She has also had recurring roles on Family Law (1999–2001), CSI: Crime Scene Investigation (2004–2005), Lincoln Heights (2007–2009), Parenthood (2010–2015) as Joy Bryant's mother and Scandal (2015).

In 2016, Lifford was cast in her first series regular role as of 1990s, in the Oprah Winfrey Network drama Queen Sugar, produced by Ava DuVernay and Oprah Winfrey. She played the role of Violet Bordelon, the aunt to the Bordelon siblings Nova (Rutina Wesley), Ralph Angel (Kofi Siriboe) and Charley (Dawn-Lyen Gardner). Violet was a spunky woman involved in a long-term relationship with a younger man (played by Omar Dorsey). For her performance, Lifford received two NAACP Image Awards nominations for Outstanding Supporting Actress in a Drama Series, as well as Black Reel Awards nomination.

Filmography

Film

Television

Awards and nominations

References

External links
 

Living people
American television actresses
American film actresses
African-American actresses
20th-century American actresses
21st-century American actresses
20th-century African-American women
20th-century African-American people
21st-century African-American women
21st-century African-American people
Year of birth missing (living people)